Joanna II (25 June 1371 – 2 February 1435) was reigning Queen of Naples from 1414 to her death, upon which the Capetian House of Anjou became extinct. As a mere formality, she used the title of Queen of Jerusalem, Sicily, and Hungary.

Early life
Joanna was born at Zara (present-day Zadar, Croatia), on 25 June 1371, as the daughter of Charles III of Naples and Margaret of Durazzo.

After 1386 Marie of Blois Duchess Dowager of Anjou started negotiations about her son Louis II of Anjou's marriage with Joanna, but Louis flatly refused to marry the daughter of his father's principal enemy in May 1387.

Joanna married her first husband, William, Duke of Austria, in Vienna in the autumn of 1401 when she was 28 years of age. He had been rejected as a husband by her cousin, Queen Hedwig of Poland. Joanna did not have any children by William, who died in 1406 after five years of marriage.  After his death she acquired a lover by the name of Pandolfello Alopo, whom she appointed Grand Chamberlain. Alopo was the first in what would become a series of lovers and male favourites. He later caused the downfall of the influential condottiero and grand constable Muzio Sforza, provoking much jealousy.

Accession
In 1414, the 41-year-old and childless Joanna succeeded her brother Ladislaus on the throne of Naples. In early 1415, she became engaged to John, a son of King Ferdinand I of Aragon and twenty-five years her junior. The betrothal was annulled shortly after, which left Joanna free to choose another husband. On 10 August 1415, she married a second time, to James II, Count of La Marche, in order to gain the support of the French monarchy. The marriage contract stipulated that upon his marriage to Joanna, James would be granted the title of Prince of Taranto. Not having received the promised title, he had Alopo killed and forced Joanna to name him King of Naples. In an attempt to assume complete power, James imprisoned Joanna in her own apartments in the royal palace; however, she was later released by the nobles.

In 1416, a riot exploded in Naples, and James was compelled to send back his French administrators and to renounce his title. In this period, Joanna began her relationship with Sergianni Caracciolo, who later acquired an overwhelming degree of power over the court. On 28 August 1417, she reconquered Rome, and the following year James left Naples for France.

Rupture with the papacy

With James now powerless, Joanna could finally celebrate her coronation on 28 October 1419, when she was crowned Queen of Sicily and Naples. However, her relationship with Naples' nominal feudal suzerain, Pope Martin V, soon worsened. Upon the advice of Caracciolo, she denied Martin economic aid to rebuild the papal army. In response, the Pope called in Louis III of Anjou, son of the rival of King Ladislaus and himself still a pretender to the Neapolitan throne. In 1420, Louis invaded Campania, but the Pope, trying to gain personal advantage from the menace posed to Joanna, called the ambassadors of the two parties to Florence.

Joanna rejected the ambiguous papal proposal calling for help from the brother of her erstwhile betrothed, the powerful King Alfonso V of Aragon, to whom she promised the hereditary title to Naples. Alfonso entered Naples in July 1421. Louis lost the support of the Pope, but at the same time the relationship between Joanna and Alfonso worsened. In May 1423, Alfonso had Caracciolo arrested and besieged Joanna's residence, the Castel Capuano. An agreement was obtained; Caracciolo was freed, and fled to Aversa with Joanna. Here she met again with Louis, declared her adoption of Alfonso to be null and void, and named Louis as her new heir. Alfonso was forced to return to Spain, so that she could be returned to Naples in April 1424. Caracciolo's exceeding ambition pushed Joanna to plot his assassination in 1432. On 19 August 1432, Sergianni Caracciolo was stabbed in his room in Castel Capuano. He was buried in Naples in the church of San Giovanni a Carbonara.

Years of peace
The remaining years of Joanna's reign were relatively peaceful. Louis dwelled in his fiefdom, the Duchy of Calabria, waiting for the call to the throne, but died in 1434. The aging Joanna named René, Louis' brother, as her heir. She died in Naples on 2 February 1435 at the age of 63, and was buried in the Church of Santa Annunziata. With her death the entire Capetian House of Anjou became extinct.

References

Sources
 Waley.P, Denley.P,(2013) Later Medieval Europe 1250-1520 Routledge
 Jansen, Drell and Andrews, (2011) eds. Medieval Italy texts in translation UPP

1371 births
1435 deaths
14th-century Italian women
15th-century Italian women
15th-century monarchs of Naples
15th-century women rulers
House of Anjou-Durazzo
Politicians from Zadar
Claimant Kings of Jerusalem
15th-century Kings of Sicily
Albanian monarchs
Queens regnant in Europe
Austrian royal consorts
Princesses of Taranto
Women in war in Italy
Women in 15th-century warfare
Women in medieval European warfare
Remarried royal consorts